During the Parade of Nations within the Rio de Janeiro 2016 Summer Olympics opening ceremony, athletes and officials from each participating team marched in the Maracanã Stadium preceded by their flag and placard bearer. Each flag bearer had been chosen either by the team's National Olympic Committee or by the athletes themselves.

Parade order

Greece entered first, as the nation of the ancient and first modern Olympic Games. The host nation Brazil marched last. Other teams entered in alphabetical order in the language of the host country (Portuguese), according with tradition and IOC guidelines. Announcers in the stadium read off the names of the marching teams in French and English (the official languages of the Olympics) as well as Portuguese, with music accompanying the athletes as they marched into the stadium.

While most countries entered teams under their short names, a few entered under more formal or alternative names, sometimes due to political or naming disputes or for historical reasons. North Macedonia entered as "Former Yugoslav Republic of Macedonia'" under E because of the naming dispute with Greece until 2020. The People's Republic of China (commonly known as China), entered as the "People's Republic of China" under C. The Republic of the Congo entered as just "Congo", right before the Democratic Republic of the Congo, which entered under its full name. Similarly, South Korea entered as "Republic of Korea" under C while North Korea entered as "Democratic People's Republic of Korea". The team from the United Kingdom used the misnomer Great Britain, for historical reasons. Additionally, Brunei, Ivory Coast, the United States, Hong Kong, Iran, Laos, Moldova, Russia, Syria, Tanzania, Timor-Leste, the United States Virgin Islands, and the British Virgin Islands all entered under their formal names, respectively "Brunei Darussalam", "Côte d’Ivoire", "United States of America", "Hong Kong, China", "Islamic Republic of Iran", "Lao People's Democratic Republic", "Republic of Moldova", "Russian Federation", "Syrian Arab Republic", "United Republic of Tanzania", "Democratic Republic of Timor-Leste", "American Virgin Islands", and "British Virgin Islands".

The Refugee Olympic Team, composed of refugees from several countries, went second to last and received a standing ovation.

Teams and flagbearers
Below is a list of parading teams their announced flag bearer in the same order as the parade. Names are given in the form officially designated by the IOC.

References

Parade of Nations
Lists of Olympic flag bearers
Parades in Brazil